Ræge Church is a parish church of the Church of Norway in Sola Municipality in Rogaland county, Norway. It is located just north of the village of Stenebyen. It is the church for the Ræge parish which is part of the Tungenes prosti (deanery) in the Diocese of Stavanger. The white, concrete, modern church was built in a rectangular design in 2009 using designs by the architect Henriette Sagland from the architectural firm Link Signatur. The church seats about 300 people.

History
In 1940, a small chapel was built at Ræge. It had seating for about 170 people. In 2009, a new, larger church was built a short distance to the south of the chapel. After the new church was completed in September 2019, the old chapel was closed and then in April 2010, the old chapel was torn down.

See also
List of churches in Rogaland

References

Sola, Norway
Churches in Rogaland
21st-century Church of Norway church buildings
Churches completed in 2009
1940 establishments in Norway